Knema austrosiamensis is a species of plant in the family Myristicaceae. It is endemic to Thailand.

References

austrosiamensis
Vulnerable plants
Endemic flora of Thailand
Trees of Thailand
Taxonomy articles created by Polbot